Etna-Troy Township is one of nine townships in Whitley County, Indiana, United States. As of the 2010 census, its population was 1,889 and it contained 921 housing units.

History
Etna Township, which was annexed by Whitley County from Noble County in 1860, merged with its neighbor to the south, Troy Township, in 1951.

Geography
Lakes in this township include Goose Lake, Indian Lake, Little Troy Cedar Lake, Loon Lake, Mud Lake, New Lake, Old Lake, Rine Lake, Robinson Lake, Scott Lake, Tadpole Lake, Troy Cedar Lake and Winters Lake. The stream of Cedar Lake Branch runs through this township.

Unincorporated towns
 Etna at 
 Lorane at 
 Ormas at 
(This list is based on USGS data and may include former settlements.)

Adjacent townships
 Washington Township, Noble County (north)
 Noble Township, Noble County (northeast)
 Thorncreek Township (east)
 Richland Township (south)
 Washington Township, Kosciusko County (west)
 Tippecanoe Township, Kosciusko County (northwest)

Cemeteries
The township contains four cemeteries: Adams, Kiester, Pleasant Grove and Scott.

Major highways
  Indiana State Road 5

References
 
 United States Census Bureau cartographic boundary files

External links
 Indiana Township Association
 United Township Association of Indiana

Townships in Whitley County, Indiana
Townships in Indiana